Strathcona Park can refer to:

Parks
Strathcona Provincial Park in British Columbia, Canada
Strathcona Park (Ottawa) in Ottawa, Canada

Communities
Strathcona Park, Calgary, a neighbourhood in Calgary, Canada

See also
Strathcona (disambiguation)